Sfiso Norbert Buthelezi (born 1961) is a South African politician and a member of the country's ruling party, the African National Congress.

Buthelezi was appointed as the Deputy Minister of Finance after president Jacob Zuma reshuffled his cabinet and removed the Minister and Deputy Minister of Finance Pravin Gordhan and Mcebisi Jonas in April 2017. He was the first CEO of the National Gambling Board before joining Makana Investment.

When Jacob Zuma resigned as the President of South Africa on 14 of February 2018 there was much media speculation that Buthelezi would be removed from Cyril Ramaphosa's cabinet.

Ramaphosa reshuffled his cabinet and moved Buthelezi to the position of Deputy Minister of Agriculture.

See also

African Commission on Human and Peoples' Rights
Constitution of South Africa
History of the African National Congress
Politics in South Africa
Provincial governments of South Africa

References

External links
Sfiso Norbert Buthelezi – People's Assembly

1961 births
Living people
People from Ray Nkonyeni Local Municipality
Zulu people
African National Congress politicians
Members of the National Assembly of South Africa
20th-century South African economists
University of Cape Town alumni
Inmates of Robben Island